Les Strongman (23 August 1924 – 8 August 2019) was a Canadian ice hockey player. He was born in Winnipeg. Strongman played professional hockey in Europe between 1946 and 1968 with Malmo FF (Sweden), Zurich SC (Switzerland) and British National League teams Nottingham Panthers and Wembley Lions. Strongman was one of the most prolific scorers in European post-war ice hockey, and was elected to the British Ice Hockey Hall of Fame in 1987.

References

External links

1924 births
2019 deaths
British Ice Hockey Hall of Fame inductees
Canadian ice hockey left wingers
Malmö Redhawks players
Nottingham Panthers players
Nottingham Panthers coaches
Ice hockey people from Winnipeg
Wembley Lions players
ZSC Lions players
Canadian expatriate ice hockey players in England